The Great Vision Concert is an album by American jazz saxophonist Fred Anderson with bassist Harrison Bankhead, which was recorded live at the 2003 Vision Festival and released four years later on Ayler Records, a Swedish label founded by Jan Ström and Åke Bjurhamn.

Reception

In a multiple review for All About Jazz Kurt Gottschalk states "This is the relaxed Anderson, stretching out with a friend, in no hurry to go anywhere: three long improvisations (15 to 22 minutes) followed by a 5-minute vamp."

A reviewer for The Free Jazz Collective wrote: "it is great from beginning to end... it is inspiring music, fun to hear, a joy for the attentive listener. Technical and musical skills abound, but the players' main focus is on the common project: the musical end result."

The authors of the 2008 Britannica Book of the Year called the album "some of his finest recent work."

Track listing
All compositions by Fred Anderson
 "Cloverleaf" - 15:26
 "Wandering" - 22:29
 "Trying to Cath the Rabbit" - 14:14
 "The Strut" - 4:56

Personnel
Fred Anderson - tenor sax
Harrison Bankhead - bass

References

2007 live albums
Fred Anderson (musician) live albums
Albums recorded at the Vision Festival
Ayler Records live albums